Loch Veyatie (Gaelic: Loch Mheathadaidh) is a large freshwater loch in north-west Scotland. It stretches for 6 km north-westwards from the settlement of Elphin, and lies between Suilven and Cùl Mòr. The loch is located in an area known as the Assynt-Coigach National Scenic Area, one of 40 such areas in Scotland.

Parish boundary
The boundary between Ross-shire and Sutherland (and therefore between the parishes of Lochbroom and Assynt) runs the length of the loch.

Angling
Well known for its trout (including ferox) and charr, it is a popular destination for anglers. Run-off from a salmon hatchery at the eastern end of the loch attracts large fish, including, unusually, charr, into its main feeder river, the Abhainn Mhòr. The reservoir Cam Loch is directly located 1 km to the northeast, and follows the same orientation.

Geography
Loch Veyatie is drained at its western end by Uidh Fheàrna, a channel of slow-moving water leading into Fionn Loch, which is itself drained by the River Kirkaig leading to the notable 20m Falls of Kirkaig before entering Loch Kirkaig.

Frigate
The Loch-class frigate  was named after the loch.

Gallery

References

External links
 Angling in Assynt A Guide for Visitors

Ross and Cromarty
Landforms of Sutherland
Veyatie
Veyatie
Kirkaig Basin